Ladies' Choice may refer to:

Film and television
Ladies' Choice (film), a 1980 Bulgarian film
"Ladies' Choice" (Roseanne), a television episode
Ladies' Choice, a 1952–53 American TV program

Music

Albums
Ladies Choice (Bill Anderson album), 1979
Ladies' Choice (George Jones album), 1984
Ladies Choice, by Latimore, 2011
Ladies' Choice or the title song, by Michael Stanley Band, 1976
Ladies' Choice, by Paul Taylor, 2007
Ladies Choice, by Shotgun, 1982

Songs
"Ladies' Choice" (Hairspray song), performed by Zac Efron in the film Hairspray, 2007
"Ladies Choice", by Underground Lovers from Leaves Me Blind, 1992

See also
Damenwahl (lit. Ladies' choice), an album by Die Toten Hosen
Lady's Choice, a condiment brand
Lady's Choice (film), a 1953 West German film
Lady's Choice, an album by Bonnie Bramlett, 1976